Sigma Zeta is a national honor society founded in 1925 to recognize undergraduate excellence in the natural sciences, computer science, and mathematics.  The society's purpose is to encourage and foster the attainment of knowledge in the natural and computer sciences and mathematics.

History
Sigma Zeta was founded in the fall of 1925 at the now defunct Shurtleff College as a local organization to provide recognition for Shurtleff science and mathematics students. Soon after that other local campuses took an interest in the group, and following the approval of the petition by McKendree College to start a chapter in June 1926 Sigma Zeta began its growth into a national collegiate honor society. In a letter that appeared in the correspondence section of the American Chemical Society Journal of Chemical Education Sigma Zeta was offered as an alternative for small colleges to the existing Sigma Xi honor society which often passed over small colleges for membership as they focused on larger Universities.

Sigma Zeta's annual convention has been held every year since 1926 except for 1943, 1944, and 1945 where it was canceled due to World War II, and in 2020 when it was canceled due to the COVID-19 Pandemic. The first three gatherings were held at the Shurtleff College campus which is now the site of the Southern Illinois University School of Dental Medicine.

Activities

The annual convention is Sigma Zeta's primary meeting where student members present papers and individual and chapter awards are presented. Individual chapters often undertake activities including the hosting of speakers and service projects to benefit their local communities. These activities can include programs for younger students at local schools helping to promote science education at early ages. Sigma Zeta's interdisciplinary nature has been described as a benefit for smaller colleges and universities because, "It brings together students from all areas of science and mathematics, including computer science, so they can all work together on projects."

Qualifications for Membership
Chapters select students for membership that have met the following eligibility criteria:
 Major studies in at least one of the Natural Sciences, Computer Science, or Mathematics
 Completion of 25 semester hours of coursework with 15 hours in the Natural Sciences, Computer Science, or Mathematics
 A Grade Point Average of 3.0 out of 4.0 both in Science and Mathematics as well as cumulatively among all classes taken

Chapters
Chapters in existence are listed in the order they joined Sigma Zeta.

 Beta, McKendree University, 1926
 Gamma, Medical College of Virginia, 1927
 Epsilon, Otterbein College, 1929
 Lambda, Mansfield University, 1936
 Mu, Minnesota State University, Mankato,  1937
 Xi, Ball State University, 1938
 Pi, Millikin University, 1943
 Rho, University of Indianapolis, 1943
 Sigma, Our Lady of the Lake University, 1944
 Tau, East Stroudsburg University of Pennsylvania, 1947
 Upsilon, Anderson University, 1948
 Phi, Eureka College, 1948
 Chi, Missouri Valley College, 1951
 Psi, Central Missouri State University, 1956
 Alpha Beta, Campbellsville University, 1963
 Alpha Gamma, Malone College, 1969
 Alpha Delta, Kansas Newman College, 1969
 Alpha Epsilon, Indiana Wesleyan University, 1969
 Alpha Zeta, Indiana State University, 1969
 Alpha Eta, Olivet College, 1969
 Alpha Theta, Asbury College, 1970
 Alpha Kappa, University of Southern Indiana, 1970
 Alpha Lambda, Suffolk University, 1970
 Alpha Mu, Immaculata College, 1971
 Alpha Nu, Oglethorpe University, 1971
 Alpha Xi, University of Virginia's College at Wise, 1971
 Alpha Pi, Trevecca Nazarene College, 1972
 Alpha Rho, Stonehill College, 1972
 Alpha Sigma, Dakota Wesleyan University, 1972
 Alpha Upsilon, Union University, 1975
 Alpha Phi, Marist College, 1975
 Alpha Chi, Eastern College, 1976
 Alpha Psi, Hillsdale College, 1976
 Alpha Omega, St. Mary of the Woods College, 1976
 Beta Alpha, Lyndon State College, 1977
 Beta Beta, George Fox University, 1978
 Beta Gamma, Columbia College, 1978
 Beta Epsilon, Arcadia University, 1979
 Beta Zeta, Cabrini College, 1981
 Beta Iota, Bethel University, 1983
 Beta Theta, Belhaven College, 1983
 Beta Eta, Evangel College, 1985
 Beta Kappa Kentucky Wesleyan College, 1991
 Beta Lambda, Messiah College, 1993
 Beta Mu, Coastal Carolina University, 1994
 Beta Delta, Gwynedd Mercy College, 1996
 Somerset Associate Chapter, Somerset Community College, 1997*
 Beta Nu, Houghton College, 1997
 Beta XI (1999) - Pikeville College, 1999
 Beta Omicron, Madonna University, 2001
 Beta Pi, University of Arkansas at Monticello, 2004
 Beta Rho, Castleton State College, 2005
 Alpena Associate Chapter, Alpena Community College, 2005*
 Beta Sigma, Baker University, 2007
 Beta Tau, Gardner-Webb University, 2008
 Beta Upsilon, Marygrove College, 2009
 Beta Phi, College of the Ozarks, 2009
 Beta Chi, Walsh University, 2011
 Beta Psi, Martin University, 2011
 Beta Omega, Virginia Wesleyan College, 2011
 Gamma Alpha, Chestnut Hill College, 2011
 Gamma Beta, Concord University, 2011
 Gamma Gamma,  Concordia College, Moorhead, MN, 2012
 Gamma Delta, The Master's College, 2012
 Gamma Epsilon, Franklin Pierce University, 2012
 Gamma Zeta,  St. Thomas Aquinas College, 2012
 Gamma Eta,  Marian University (Indiana), 2012
 Gamma Theta,  Georgian Court University, 2013
 Gamma Iota,  Neumann University, 2013
 Gamma Kappa,  Southwest Baptist University, 2014
 College of the Canyons Associate Chapter,  College of the Canyons, 2014*
 Gamma Lambda (2015) Missouri Baptist University, St. Louis, MO 63141
 Gamma Mu (2015) Baptist College of Health Sciences, Memphis, TN 38104
 Gamma Nu (2015) Chowan University, Murfreesboro, NC 27855
 Gamma Xi (2015) King's College, Wilkes-Barre, PA 18701
 Gamma Omicron (2015) Saint Joseph's University, Philadelphia, PA 19131
 Gamma Pi (2017) Warner University, Lake Wales, Fl 33859
 Gamma Rho (2017) Miami Dade College InterAmerican Campus, Miami, Fl 33135
 Gamma Sigma (2018) Colorado Christian University, Lakewood, CO 80226
 Gamma Tau (2018) Faulkner University, Montgomery, AL 36109
 Gamma UPSILON (2018) Wilmington University, New Castle, DE 19720
 Olive-Harvey College Associate Chapter (2019) Olive-Harvey College Chicago, IL 60628*

Associate chapters, marked with an asterisk, are chapters of Sigma Zeta on two-year community college campuses, including Somerset Community College, Alpena Community College and College of the Canyons, with Somerset Community College home to the first associate chapter.

References

External links
 www.sigmazeta.org Official website
 The Sigma Zetan The Official Publication of Sigma Zeta

Honor societies
Scientific societies based in the United States
Student organizations established in 1925
1925 establishments in Illinois